St. Barnabas Episcopal Church is a historic Episcopal church located at SE 4th Street and St. Barnabas Road in Snow Hill, Greene County, North Carolina. It was built in 1887, and is a small, rectangular, Carpenter Gothic style frame building.  It sits on a low brick foundation and has a steep gable roof.

It was listed on the National Register of Historic Places in 1979.

References

Episcopal church buildings in North Carolina
Churches on the National Register of Historic Places in North Carolina
Gothic Revival church buildings in North Carolina
Churches completed in 1887
19th-century Episcopal church buildings
Buildings and structures in Greene County, North Carolina
National Register of Historic Places in Greene County, North Carolina